The Rajgoda railway station in the Indian state of West Bengal, serves Near NH 41,Rajgoda, India in Purba Medinipur district. It is on the Panskura–Haldia line.

History
Rajgoda railway station is situated in near NH 41, Rajgoda, West Bengal. Station code is RGA. It is a small railway station in Panskura–Haldia line. Neighbourhood stations are Raghunathbari and Saheed Matangini. Local EMU trains Haldia–Howrah Fast Local, Digha–Panskura local, Mecheda–Digha local, Haldia–Panskura local, Howrah–Haldia local train stop here. The Panskura–Durgachak line was opened in 1968, at a time when Haldia Port was being constructed. It was subsequently extended to Haldia.  The Panskura–Haldia line was electrified in 1974–76. All lines were electrified with 25 kV AC overhead system. EMU train services between Panskura and Haldia introduced in 1976 and direct EMU services between Howrah and Haldia in 1979.

References

External links
Trains at Rajgoda

Railway stations in Purba Medinipur district
Kolkata Suburban Railway stations